In algebraic geometry, a Weddle surface, introduced by , is a quartic surface in 3-dimensional projective space, given by the locus of vertices of the  family of cones passing through 6 points in general position.

Weddle surfaces have 6 nodes and are birational to Kummer surfaces.

References

Algebraic surfaces
Complex surfaces